U.S. Route 41 (US 41) in the state of Kentucky is a north-south United States Numbered Highway that mainly goes through the western part of the state. It enters Kentucky in the Todd County community of Guthrie, and leaves the state north of Henderson into Indiana as well as the city of Evansville.

Route description
US 41 enters the state in Guthrie, Kentucky, and begins northwest to traverse the towns of Trenton and Pembroke before reaching Hopkinsville. US 41 turns northward from downtown Hopkinsville to Crofton, Nortonville, Mortons Gap, Earlington and Madisonville, in Hopkins County. US 41 then continues into eastern Webster before reaching the city of Henderson. It enters Indiana and the city of Evansville north of the Ohio River in the one area of Henderson County where the Ohio River is separate from the state line.

Notable sites of interest along US 41 in Kentucky include:
Robert Penn Warren Birthplace Museum, Guthrie
Trail of Tears Park, Hopkinsville
Ellis Park Race Course, Henderson
John James Audubon State Park, Henderson

History

Between 1926 and 1930, US 41 followed a more westerly route between Hopkinsville and Nashville, following the current US 41 Alt., while the current US 41 alignment was US 241. From 1930 into the early 1940s, the current alignment of US 41 was signed as US 41E, and the US 41W designation was on the current alignment of US 41 Alt. south of Hopkinsville. In 1943, the western route became US 41 Alt., while US 41E became the current alignment of US 41.

In Hopkins County, US 41 previously followed the Pennyrile Parkway (much of which is now part of I-169 and I-69) between exits 30 and 45 until the early 1990s, when it was rerouted onto the former US 41 Alt. alignment from Madisonville to just south of Nortonville. This was the only area of the Pennyrile Parkway where tolls were never charged when the parkway was originally a toll road.

Near Henderson, US 41 was rerouted onto the few remaining miles of the Pennyrile Parkway up to its northern terminus in the 2010s before I-69 was designated onto most of the parkway to Nortonville.

Major intersections

Related routes

References

External links

US 41 at KentuckyRoads.com

 Kentucky
041
0041
0041
0041
0041
0041